Self- Arising Primordial Awareness is one of the Seventeen tantras of Dzogchen Upadesha.

English discourse
In the Lungi Terdzö (Wylie: lung gi gter mdzod) the prose autocommentary by Longchenpa (1308 – 1364 or possibly 1369) to his Chöying Dzö (Wylie: chos dbyings mdzod) -- which are numbered amongst the Seven Treasuries (Wylie: mdzod chen bdun) -- the following embedded quotation from this Tantra has been rendered into English by Barron, et al. (2001: p. 9) and the Wylie has been secured from Wikisource and interspersed and embedded in the English gloss for probity:
<poem>
Within the essence of ultimate truth, [yang dag don gyi ngo bo la]
there is no buddha or ordinary being. [sangs rgyas dang ni sems can med]
Since awareness cannot be reified, it is empty. [rig pa 'dzin pa med pas stong]
Given that it does not dwell in emptiness, [stong pa nyid la me gnas na]
it abides in its own state of supreme bliss. [rang gi bde chen sa la gnas]
The majestic ruler of all buddhas [sangs rgyas kun gyi rje btsan pa]
is understood to be one's own awareness. [rang gi rig pa shes par bya]
This monarch, naturally manifest awareness, [rang snang rig pa'i rgyal po nyid]
is present in everyone, but no one realizes it. [kun la yod de kun gyis rtog pa med]'Rig pa rang shar chen po'i rgyud'. Source:  (accessed: Monday April 5, 2010)
</poem></blockquote>

Ho! The atiyoga of natural perfection! Dzogchen Ati! .The Great Perfection, in its unbiased inclusivity, 
actualizes the meaning of self-sprung awareness. As the lion overawes all other beasts with his roar, 
so the language of Great Perfection commands the gradual approaches; 
speaking a tongue of its own, it engenders its own ultimate meaning. 
The land of natural perfection is free of buddhas and sentient beings; 
the ground of natural perfection is free of good and bad; 
the path of natural perfection has no length; 
the fruition of natural perfection can neither be avoided nor attained; 
the body of natural perfection is neither existent nor nonexistent; 
the speech of natural perfection is neither sacred nor profane; 
and the mind of natural perfection has no substance nor attribute. The space of natural perfection cannot be consumed nor voided; 
the status of natural perfection is neither high nor low; 
the praxis of natural perfection is neither developed nor neglected; 
the potency of natural perfection is neither fulfilled nor frustrated; 
the display of natural perfection is neither manifest nor latent; 
the actuality of natural perfection is neither cultivated nor ignored; 
and the gnosis of natural perfection is neither visible nor invisible. The hidden awareness of natural perfection is everywhere, 
its parameters beyond indication, its actuality incommunicable; the sovereign view of natural perfection is the here-and-now, 
naturally present without speech or books, irrespective of conceptual clarity or dullness, 
but as spontaneous joyful creativity its reality is nothing at all. In the verse of homage, the first, second and third lines reveal the self-sprung natural essence while the fourth line shows familiarity with that unchanging space of reality. The fruition of natural perfection is distinguished from our ordinary disposition by nothing more than an indication about the existential ground (the starting point that is 'basic total presence' adduced in the first line of the vajra-homage). All experience, therefore, is revealed as perfect and complete in the gnosis of pure mind. There is no imperfection anywhere: Perfect in one, perfect in two, perfect in all, 
life is blissfully easy. Unity is perfect as unitary pure mind, duality is perfect as the mind's creation, 
and multiplicity is abundant completion. In the transmission of the perfection of unity 
lies the pure buddha-dynamic; the teaching on the perfection of duality reveals everything as perfect projection; 
and by virtue of the perfection of multiplicity everything turns whole and splendid. Abiding here, doing nothing, 
embodied as man or god, our dynamic is buddha-reality; here sentient beings are cared for, And without any exertion we live in ease.

Why Buddha is considered as the greatest and the most skillful spiritual teacher of all beings in the entire universe??? It's because Buddha has immense compassion for all sentient beings and has realized that he can only be able to benefit and provide eternal happiness and bring peace to all beings by awakening to wisdom of truth and compassion. He never created any religious or spiritual systems which has central authority or systematic way to control individuals for sake of his doctrinal purpose but rather he wanted to give each individual ultimate freedom to Enlightenment. Actually, the essence of his spiritual teaching is to realize nature of truth and cessation of suffering by dismantling all kinds of authoritarian systems and conquer its authority by power of truth through meditation, concentration, awareness, analytical wisdom and compassion. In this process, which will give an opportunity to every authentic individual practitioner to experience truth for himself to get enlightenment and have his own dominant power over all systems in every aspects of cyclic existence like Buddha himself. In this process of conquering all authoritarian systems such as culture, language, financial, religion, government, education, gender are external establishment and internal habituation such as desire, ignorance, delusion, hatred, greed and Maras are inner conceptual establishment. In order to conquer both form of authoritarian systems wisely and nonviolently or even to conquer both life and death itself through practice of meditation is way to get a perfect awakening to ultimate truth of Enlightenment for benefit of all sentient beings.

Primary resources
Rig pa rang shar chen po'i rgyud @ Wikisource in Wylie
Rig pa rang shar chen po'i rgyud @ Wikisource in Uchen (Tibetan Script), Unicode

Notes

Dzogchen texts
Nyingma tantras